Majid Husain was an Indian geographer, known for his contributions to geography.

Early life
Husain was born in Haridwar district of Uttrakhand. He was M.A. In geography (Gold Medalist), an LL.B. and a PhD. He died on January 24, 2019.

Bibliography

 Geography of India
 World Geography
 Fundamentals of Physical Geography
 Geography: 3000 Terms and Concepts
 Indian and World Geography
 Environment and Ecology - Biodiversity, Climate Change and Disaster Management
 Human Geography
 Evolution Of Geographical Thought
 Population Geography (Perspectives in Human Geography)
 Models in Geography
 Systematic Agricultural Geography
 Bio-geography (Perspectives in Physical Geography)

References

External links 

 
 
 https://www.okhlatimes.com/jamia-millia-death/

1940 births
Indian geographers
Indian geologists
Geomorphologists
Indian male writers
Aligarh Muslim University alumni
People from Haridwar district
2019 deaths
20th-century Indian earth scientists
Scientists from Uttarakhand